The 1974 Major League Baseball All-Star Game was the 45th playing of the midsummer classic between the all-stars of the American League (AL) and National League (NL), the two leagues comprising Major League Baseball. The game was held on July 23, 1974, at Three Rivers Stadium in Pittsburgh, Pennsylvania the home of the Pittsburgh Pirates of the National League. The game resulted in the National League defeating the American League 7–2.

This marked the third time the Pirates had been host for the All-Star Game (the first two having been in 1944 and the first game in 1959).  This would be the first of two times that the game would be played at Three Rivers Stadium, with the stadium hosting again in 1994.

American League roster
The American League roster included 10 future Hall of Fame players, denoted in italics.

Elected starters

Pitchers

Reserve position players

Coaching staff

National League roster
The National League roster included 7 future Hall of Fame players, denoted in italics.

Elected starters

Pitchers

Reserve position players

Coaching staff

Starting lineups
While the starters were elected by the fans, the batting orders and starting pitchers were selected by the managers.

Umpires

Scoring summary
The National League took a 1–0 lead in the bottom of the second off of AL starter Gaylord Perry.  With two outs, Steve Garvey singled, and then scored on Ron Cey's double.

The American League responded immediately, scoring twice off of NL starter Andy Messersmith in the top of the third inning.  Thurman Munson led off with a double to open the inning, and advanced to third base on a successful sacrifice bunt by Gaylord Perry.  Rod Carew walked.  The next batter, Bert Campaneris, struck out as Carew stole second base.  Carew immediately advanced to third base on the throwing error by NL catcher Johnny Bench, which also allowed Munson to score.  Reggie Jackson walked.  Dick Allen singled sending Jackson to second base, and scoring Carew.  This ended the scoring for the American League.

The NL retook the lead with a two-run bottom of the fourth inning off of AL relief pitcher, Luis Tiant.  Johnny Bench led off with a single, and advanced to third base when Jimmy Wynn singled in the next at-bat.  Steve Garvey doubled, scoring Bench, and sending Wynn to third base.  Ron Cey grounded out, permitting Garvey to advance to third base and scoring Wynn.

In the bottom of the fifth inning, the NL added an unearned run.  Pinch hitter Lou Brock singled.  With Joe Morgan batting, Brock stole second base, and advanced to third base on a throwing error by AL catcher Thurman Munson.  Morgan hit a sacrifice fly to the outfield, permitting Brock to tag up and score from third base, and extend the NL lead to 4–2.

In the bottom of the seventh inning, with Catfish Hunter in his second inning of relief pitching for the AL, Reggie Smith led off with a home run to push the NL lead to 5–2.

The NL closed out the game's scoring in the bottom of the eighth inning facing the new AL relief pitcher, Rollie Fingers.  With one out, Mike Schmidt walked, and then scored on Don Kessinger's triple.  With Mike Marshall batting, Kessinger scored when Fingers threw a wild pitch.  The final two runs brought the final score to 7–2.

Line score

Game notes and records
Ken Brett was credited with the win.  Luis Tiant was credited with the loss.

Dick Williams was manager of the American League squad by virtue of having been manager of the 1973 American League Champion Oakland Athletics.  Williams left the team after the season, and was signed to manage the California Angels.

Steve Garvey's name was omitted from the ballots given to fans.  He was elected to the NL squad by virtue of a successful write-in campaign.

References

External links
 1974 All-Star Game overview @baseball-reference.com
 1974 All-Star Game overview @baseball almanac.com
 1974 All-Star Game Box Score @baseball almanac.com
 1974 All-Star Game Play-by-Play @baseball almanac.com

Major League Baseball All-Star Game
Major League Baseball All-Star Game
Baseball competitions in Pittsburgh
Major League Baseball All Star Game
Major League Baseball All-Star Game
1970s in Pittsburgh